Leona Valley AVA is an American Viticulture Area (AVA) in northeastern Los Angeles County, California.  It is located in Leona Valley within the Sierra Pelona Mountains of Southern California.

The  Leona Valley American Viticulture Area was established on October 29, 2008 by the Alcohol and Tobacco Tax and Trade Bureau, announced by the publication of Treasury Decision TTB-71.

Geography 

This valley is separated from the Pacific Ocean by the San Gabriel Mountains to the south and the Santa Susana Mountains to the southwest. Portal Ridge on the northeast divides Leona Valley from the Antelope Valley and Mojave Desert.

Geology 
The geology of the area is very young alluvium surrounded by very old parent rock. These old rocks have weathered to clay, which is incorporated in the alluvial soils of the valley.

Viniculture 
Leona Valley is currently home to several growers.  They are growing Sangiovese, Zinfandel, Cabernet Sauvignon, Cabernet Franc, Chardonnay, Petite Verdot, Pinot noir, Syrah, and Malbec covering the French, Rhône, and Burgundy regions of grape varieties. Many grape varietals thrive thanks to the region's soil and balanced temperatures.

History 
Some of the early wineries of California were established in and around the Leona Valley. Previously flourishing, Prohibition shut them all down in the early 20th century. When federal regulators came to break up the wine barrels so they could no longer be used, it was said the creeks ran red. Many old-timers in the wine industry from Napa and Sonoma still remember and speak of the Leona Valley for its outstanding wines from the pre-prohibition days.

Many of the vineyards planted long ago are still alive and producing usable grapes for wine production in the region. The Leona Valley Winery is an active vineyard here.

See also
 Antelope Valley of the California High Desert AVA
 Sierra Pelona Valley AVA

References

External links
 TTB recognition press release
 leonavalleywinery.com

American Viticultural Areas of California
American Viticultural Areas of Southern California
Geography of Los Angeles County, California
Sierra Pelona Ridge
Valleys of Los Angeles County, California
American Viticultural Areas
2008 establishments in California